HushHush is a Philippine teen drama on TV5. It aired from 27 August to 19 November 2008.

Plot
HushHush revolves around the lives of wanna-be celebrities as they break into the world of showbiz.

Cast
 Bernard Palanca
 Dominic Ochoa as Toby
 Joem Bascon as Andy
 Valeen Montenegro as Roxy
 Krista Ranillo as Kate
 Joseph Bitangcol
 Bruno Folster as Jinno
 Ina Feleo as Sarah
 Ana Feleo

See also
List of programs aired by TV5 (Philippines)

References

TV5 (Philippine TV network) original programming
Philippine drama television series
2000s teen drama television series
2008 Philippine television series debuts
2008 Philippine television series endings